Timo Staffeldt (born 9 February 1984) is a German former professional footballer who played as a midfielder.

Career
Staffeldt began his career 1990 with six years for SpVgg Ketsch and played six years for the club's youth sides, before being scouted by Karlsruher SC  in summer 1996. In the 2003–04 season he was promoted to the reserve team and two years later earned his first professional caps for the team.

References

External links
 
 

1984 births
Living people
Association football midfielders
German footballers
Bundesliga players
2. Bundesliga players
3. Liga players
Regionalliga players
Karlsruher SC players
Karlsruher SC II players
VfL Osnabrück players
FC Viktoria Köln players
Alemannia Aachen players
Sportspeople from Heidelberg
Footballers from Baden-Württemberg